Bel Air is a village in Saint Philip Parish in Barbados.

The area is best known for its beautiful bay (known as Belair Bay), with turquoise waters and pink sands. While it's a beautiful sight and place to sunbathe and picnic, great care should be taken swimming here as the waters are lively and there is no lifeguard on duty.

Populated places in Barbados